{{DISPLAYTITLE:Technetium (99mTc) medronic acid}}

Technetium (99mTc) medronic acid  is a pharmaceutical product used in nuclear medicine to localize bone metastases as well as other diseases that can alter the natural turn-over in the bone by bone scintigraphy.

Chemistry
The drug is a complex of medronic acid (MDP, methylene diphosphonate), the simplest bisphosphonate, with technetium-99m (99mTc), a radionuclide that emits gamma rays. The exact structure of the complex is not known.

Manufacture
99mTc-MDP must be prepared in a radiopharmacy. It is usually supplied as a "cold kit" to which radioactive 99mTc from a generator is added. Kit composition may vary between suppliers, but contents typically includes medronic acid, stannous chloride dihydrate and sometimes ascorbic acid. Pertechnetate, eluted from the generator is added to the kit vial, which is swirled and left to stand. The labelling efficiency, an indication of how much 99mTc remains in pertechnetate form rather than bound to the MDP, can be measured using chromatography.

References

External links 
 

Bisphosphonates
Technetium-99m